Flight 956 may refer to

West Coast Airlines Flight 956, crashed on 1 October 1966
Iran Air Tours Flight 956, crashed on 12 February 2002

0956